Logovsky is a rural locality (a khutor) in Perekopskoye Rural Settlement, Kletsky District, Volgograd Oblast, Russia. The population was 220 as of 2010. There are 4 streets.

Geography 
Logovsky is located in steppe, on the Krepkaya River, 19 km east of Kletskaya (the district's administrative centre) by road. Perekopka is the nearest rural locality.

References 

Rural localities in Kletsky District